The Battle of Waj Rudh (Waay Rudha) was fought in 642/643 between the Rashidun Caliphate under Nu'man, and the Sasanian Empire under the Dailamite Muta, the Parthian Farrukhzad and Isfandiyar, and the Armenian Varaztirots. The battle was fought in Waj Rudh, a village in Hamadan. The location was precisely theorized and occurred on a road junction between Hamadan and Qazvin.

The Sasanians were defeated under heavy casualties, which included the death of Muta and Varaztirots. According to Tabari, the scale of the battle was said to have rivalled the battle of Nahavand, As according to G. Rex Smith, this means Waj al-Rudh was the greatest calamity of Sassanid after Nahavand and battle of al-Qadisiyyah.

References

Sources 

642
643
Waj Rudh
Waj Rudh
Muslim conquest of Persia
Waj Rudh
640s in the Rashidun Caliphate
640s in the Sasanian Empire